Silicone granulomas are a skin condition that occur as a reaction to liquid silicones, and are characterized by the formation of nodules.

Formation of a granuloma is a common tissue response to a range of foreign bodies. Silicone can be directly injected into tissue as part of a cosmetic procedure or it can leak from silicone implants. The formation and consequences of silicon-induced granulomas is not well described or understood. The extent of damage that they cause is controversial.

Localization 
 Lymph node: Granulomatous lymphadenitis 
 Skin: Granulomatous dermatitis
 Penis 
 Breast: Granulomatous mastitis
 Face: Granulomatous facial reaction

Effects 
Silicone-induced granuloma can be associated with fever, calcitriol-mediated hypercalcemia,  reactive amyloidosis.

Gallery

See also 
 Granuloma
 Skin lesion

References 

Skin conditions resulting from physical factors
Silicone-induced lesion